The Mauritius national under-20 football team is the national under-20 football team of Mauritius, controlled by the Mauritius Football Association. The Mauritius national under-20 football team is composed of the 20 best national football players, aged 20 years or less, selected from the 4 CTR's (Centre Technique Regional) spread throughout Mauritius and from the 1st Division Senior & Junior National Teams. The main tournaments the team competes in are the COSAFA U-20 Challenge Cup, organized in November every year in South Africa, and the African Youth Championship, held every two years. It has never qualified for the FIFA U-20 World Cup. The players in the team are being prepared to join the Mauritius national football team in the coming years. The best result for the team to date is a 3-1 win over the Zambia national under-20 football team in 2011 African Youth Championship qualifying.

Competition records

FIFA U-20 World Cup
1977 to 2009 - Did not enter / Did not qualify

African Youth Championship
1977 - Did not enter 
1979 - Second Round
1981 to 1991 - Did not enter / Did not qualify
1993 to 1995 - Group Stage
1997 to 2011 - Did not enter / Did not qualify

COSAFA U-20 Challenge Cup
1983 to 2009 - Did not enter / Did not qualify
2010 - Group Stage

Players

Current squad
The following players were named to the Mauritius U-20 squad for the 2011 COSAFA U-20 Cup.

|-----
! colspan="9" bgcolor="#B0D3FB" align="left" |
|----- bgcolor="#DFEDFD"
|-

|-----
! colspan="9" bgcolor="#B0D3FB" align="left" |
|----- bgcolor="#DFEDFD"
|-

|-----
! colspan="9" bgcolor="#B0D3FB" align="left" |
|----- bgcolor="#DFEDFD"

|-----
! colspan="9" bgcolor="#B0D3FB" align="left" |
|----- bgcolor="#DFEDFD"
|-

Recent callups
The following players have also been called up to the national under-20 squad within the last twelve months: Updated November 19, 2011

|-----
! colspan="9" bgcolor="#B0D3FB" align="left" |
|----- bgcolor="#DFEDFD"
|-

|-----
! colspan="9" bgcolor="#B0D3FB" align="left" |
|----- bgcolor="#DFEDFD"
|-

|-----
! colspan="9" bgcolor="#B0D3FB" align="left" |
|----- bgcolor="#DFEDFD"
|-

Staff

Current staff

Schedule

Recent results

Upcoming fixtures

2011 COSAFA U-20 Challenge Cup

Group C

See also
Mauritius national under-17 football team
Mauritius national football team

References

External links
 Mauritius national under-20 football team official page

African national under-20 association football teams
U